|}

The Solario Stakes is a Group 3 flat horse race in Great Britain open to two-year-old horses. It is run at Sandown Park over a distance of 7 furlongs (1,408 metres), and it is scheduled to take place each year in late August or early September.

History
The event is named after Solario, a successful racehorse in the 1920s and subsequently a leading sire. It was established in 1947, and the inaugural running was won by Panair.

For a period the Solario Stakes was classed at Listed level. It was promoted to Group 3 status in 1986.

The race was formerly held during Sandown Park's Variety Club Day, an annual fundraising event for the Variety Club. The 2011 running promoted the charity's Sunshine Coaches. In 2012 Variety Club day was moved to August and the race has since been sponsored by various companies and organisations.

Records
Leading jockey (6 wins):
 Lester Piggott – March Past (1952), Pindari (1958), Speed of Sound (1966), Remand (1967), The Fort (1982), Oh So Sharp (1984)

Leading trainer (6 wins):
 Henry Cecil – Lyphard's Wish (1978), The Fort (1982), Oh So Sharp (1984), Sanquirico (1987), High Estate (1988), Be My Chief (1989)
 John Gosden - Foss Way (2002), 	Windsor Knot (2004), Raven's Pass (2007), Kingman (2013), Too Darn Hot (2018), Reach For The Moon (2021)

Winners since 1960

Earlier winners

 1947: Panair
 1948: Suntime
 1949: Scratch
 1950: Turco II
 1951: Gay Time
 1952: March Past
 1953: Barton Street
 1954: North Cone
 1955: Castelmarino
 1956: Nagaika
 1957: Aggressor
 1958: Pindari
 1959: Intervener
 1960: Dual
 1961: Hidden Meaning
 1962: Happy Omen
 1963: Penny Stall
 1964: Rehearsed
 1965: Charlottown
 1966: Speed of Sound
 1967: Remand
 1968: Murrayfield
 1969: Miracle
 1970: Athens Wood
 1971: Meadow Mint
 1972: Duke of Ragusa
 1973–74: no race
 1975: Over to You
 1976: Avgerinos
 1977: Bolak

See also
 Horse racing in Great Britain
 List of British flat horse races

References
 Racing Post:
 galopp-sieger.de – Solario Stakes.
 horseracingintfed.com – International Federation of Horseracing Authorities – Solario Stakes (2018).
 pedigreequery.com – Solario Stakes – Sandown Park.
 

Flat races in Great Britain
Sandown Park Racecourse
Flat horse races for two-year-olds
Recurring sporting events established in 1947
1947 establishments in England